Katherine Diamond (born April 9, 1954), Kate Diamond, FAIA, LEED AP,  is an American architect. She was born in Chicago, went to college in Israel, where she served in the Israeli Air Force. She then returned to the US.

Education 
Diamond completed her undergrad at the Technion-Machon Technologi Le' Israel.

Career
Diamond is a Design principal at HDR in Los Angeles, California. She has also worked at HMC, NBBJ, RNL. With Norma Sklarek and Margot Siegel, Diamond founded the Los Angeles firm Siegel, Sklarek and Diamond, the largest woman-owned firm of the time which then became Siegel Diamond Architects.

From 1993 to 1994, she was the first woman to serve as President of the Los Angeles chapter of the American Institute of Architects in 99 years. In 1996, she was elected the College of Fellows of the American Institute of Architects (FAIA) and was the president of the Association for Women in Architecture from 1985 to 1987  She also is on the National Peer Review Council for the GSA Design Excellence Program and taught design studios at University of Southern California, School of Architecture.

Awards
Los Angeles Business Council Urban Beautification Award – for Baldwin Park Commuter Rail Station
Los Angeles Business Council Urban Beautification Award – for design of 4 Elevated Light Rail Stations
National Commercial Builders Council Award of Excellence – for the Park Beyond the Park, Torrance, CA
US Air Force Design Award – for concept design of Personnel Support Faculty
City of Los Angeles Beautification Award – for Otto Nemenz International Building

Exhibitions
100 Projects – 100 Years – AIA Los Angeles Chapter
Broadening the Discourse – Los Angeles, California Women in Environmental Design exhibit
The Exceptional One and Many More
Women in American Architecture 1988–1989: A Southern California Perspective -AIA Los Angeles Chapter/Women in Architecture exhibit

Notable projects
LAX Air Traffic Control Tower
Central Utility Plant with Co-Generation UC Davis Medical Center
Universal City Metro Rail Station
UCI Student Services Addition
New Jefferson Elementary School 
Baldwin Park Commuter Rail Station
Richstone Family Center
Joint USA / Canadian Port of Entry at Sweetgrass, Montana / Coutts, Alberta
UC Davis Medical Center Central Plant
The US Magistrate Courthouse, Bakersfield CA
The District Courthouse, Billings Montana

References

20th-century American architects
1954 births
Living people
American women architects
21st-century American architects
Architects from Los Angeles
20th-century American women
21st-century American women